Mental Radio:  Does it work, and how? (1930) was written by the American author Upton Sinclair and initially self-published.  This book documents Sinclair's test of psychic abilities of Mary Craig Sinclair, his second wife, while she was in a state of profound depression with a heightened interest in the occult.  She attempted to duplicate 290 pictures which were drawn by her brother.  Sinclair claimed Mary successfully duplicated 65 of them, with 155 "partial successes" and 70 failures. The experiments were not conducted in a controlled scientific laboratory environment.

The German edition included a preface written by Albert Einstein who admired the book and praised Sinclair's writing abilities. The psychical researcher Walter Franklin Prince conducted an independent analysis of the results in 1932. He believed that telepathy had been demonstrated in Sinclair's data. Prince's analysis was published as "The Sinclair Experiments for Telepathy" in Part I of Bulletin XVI of the Boston Society for Psychical Research in April, 1932 and was included in the addendum for the book.

Critical reception

On the subject of occult and pseudoscience topics, Sinclair has been described as credulous. Martin Gardner wrote "As Mental Radio stands, it is a highly unsatisfactory account of conditions surrounding the clairvoyancy tests. Throughout his entire life, Sinclair has been a gullible victim of mediums and psychics." Gardner also wrote the possibility of sensory leakage during the experiment had not been ruled out:

When Mrs. Sinclair was tested by William McDougall under better precautions the results were less than satisfactory.

References

Further reading
 Leon Harris (1975). Upton Sinclair, American Rebel. Crowell.

1930 non-fiction books
Books by Upton Sinclair
Parapsychology
Self-published books
Telepathy